Morete  may refer to:
 Carlos Morete, a retired Argentine football striker
  a synonym for the Portuguese Baga grape variety